is a fictional character appearing in the 2004 role-playing video game Paper Mario: The Thousand-Year Door. She initially serves as an enemy to the player character Mario, later joining the player's party after he helps her. In the Japanese version and European language translations, she is a transgender woman, while the script in English releases was altered to remove any mention of her trans status. Vivian has been called one of the best LGBTQ characters in video games.

Concept and creation
Vivian is a purple, ghost-like person with pink hair, white gloves, and a pink-and-white striped hat with the ability to hide herself in shadows and can manipulate flames.  Her two older sisters, Beldam and Marilyn, wear blue and yellow hats respectively and vary in size.  Vivian is a transgender woman, and is mocked by Beldam, who misgenders her and calls her a cross-dresser.

In the original Japanese version, Vivian is described as a boy who looks like a girl, and not explicitly transgender. This detail was carried over to the French and Spanish translations. When Paper Mario: The Thousand-Year Door was localized to English and German, Vivian's status as a trans woman was not mentioned, and the transphobia from her sister was changed to insults about her appearance. In non-English/German localizations of the game, Vivian is still recognized as transgender. The Italian version, in particular, emphasizes her status as a trans woman by having Vivian express pride in having transitioned; she pushes back against her sister's bullying by saying "I'm proud to have turned into a woman!"

Appearances
Vivian first appeared in the 2004 role-playing video game Paper Mario: The Thousand-Year Door. In the story of the game, she initially works as a member of the Shadow Sirens, which includes her two sisters Beldam and Marilyn, working against Mario and his allies. She assists Mario when he helps her find a missing object, unaware of his actual identity. When she discovers who he is, Vivian is initially reluctant to help him further, but decides to join him due to the abuse she suffered from Beldam and the kindness Mario showed her. By the end of the story, Beldam vows to treat her better.

She appears in a cameo role in the sequel, Super Paper Mario, both as a collectible card and as a plush doll owned by a character. She also appears as a collectible in Super Smash Bros. Brawl and Super Smash Bros. Ultimate.

Reception
Vivian has received mostly positive reception since her appearance in Paper Mario: The Thousand-Year Door, becoming a popular character. Nintendojo writer Mel Turnquist included Vivian's decision to stay by Mario's side as one of their most inspiring moments in video games due in part to also being a younger sibling herself. Liberty Voice called Vivian's defection from her sisters to Mario's side relatable to children. Inverse included Vivian in a series where they discuss potential Super Smash Bros. inclusions, expressing hope that she is included instead of a more traditional choice like Paper Mario.

She has received particular attention for her status as a transgender character. IGN included Vivian in their list of favorite LGBTQ+ (lesbian, gay, bisexual, transgender, queer, and others) characters. They praised Vivian for not being defined by her status as a trans person, though expressed disappointment in the change from trans woman to cis woman in the English releases due to Vivian being one of few quality trans characters in video games. Drag queen Daphne J. Sumtimez listed Vivian as one of her idols. In their essay on transgender characters, authors Emil Christenson and Danielle Unéus discuss Vivian and how her femininity is designed. They mention Vivian's bent wrists and frequent smiling as feminine qualities that she typically displays. They also bring up the pink color of her hat, noting that the contrast between her sisters may be intentional to heighten her femininity. They acknowledge the transphobia Vivian receives, but comment that it is depicted negatively due to her sisters being villains. Author Nicholas Taylor includes her in a section on transgender characters in the book Queerness in Play, discussing how Vivian's role in the narrative can help players understand their experiences with gender, identity, and expression.

Some critics were displeased with how Vivian's gender was presented in the Japanese localization, however. Writer Laura Kate Dale was critical of dialogue in the game that stated she was at one time male, feeling it suggested she was not truly female. In their breakdown of LGBTQ+ representation in video games, writers Quincy Nolan and Ian Laih-Nolan included Vivian, similarly criticizing the language used in the Japanese version to describe her but noting that it does not take away from her "gender-bending presence." Vivian has been compared to fellow trans Nintendo character Birdo, who is similarly misgendered in some games and had her trans identity removed in English localizations.

References

Female characters in video games
Fictional characters who can turn invisible
Fictional transgender women
Fictional humanoids
LGBT characters in video games
Mario (franchise) characters
Female video game villains
Role-playing video game characters
Video game characters introduced in 2004
Video game characters who can teleport
Video game characters who use magic
Fictional characters who can manipulate darkness or shadows
Video game characters with fire or heat abilities
Child characters in video games
Teenage characters in video games
Child superheroes
Paper Mario
Video game bosses
LGBT villains
Nintendo antagonists
Nintendo protagonists
Intelligent Systems characters